A power user is a user of computers, software and other electronic devices, who uses advanced features of computer hardware, operating systems, programs, or websites which are not used by the average user. A power user might not have extensive technical knowledge of the systems they use but is rather characterized by competence or desire to make the most intensive use of computer programs or systems.

In enterprise software systems, "Power User" may be a formal role given to an individual who is not a programmer, but who is a specialist in business software. Often these are people who retain their normal user job role but also function in testing, training, and first-tier support of the enterprise software.

Some software applications are regarded as particularly suited for power users and may be designed as such. Examples include VLC media player, a multimedia framework, player, and server, which includes complex features not found in other media player suites.

Interface design issues

Usage intensity 
User testing for software often focuses on inexperienced or regular users. Power users can require different user interface elements compared to regular and minimal users, as they may need less help and fewer cues. A power user might use a program full-time, compared to a casual or occasional user, and thus a program which caters to power users will typically include features that make the interface easier for experts to use, even if these features might be mystifying to beginners.

Shortcuts 
A typical example is extensive keybindings, like Ctrl+F or Alt+Enter; having keyboard bindings and shortcuts for many functions is a hallmark of power-user centric software design, as it enables users who put forth more effort to learn the shortcuts to operate the program quickly without removing their hands from the keyboard. Power users typically want to operate the software with few interactions, or as fast as possible, and also be able to perform tasks in a precise, exactly-reproducible way, where casual users may be happy if the program can be intuitively made to do approximately what they wanted. To aid in the automation of repetitive tasks during heavy usage, power-user centric interfaces often provide the ability to compose macros, and program functions may be pre-conceived to with the intention that they will be used programmatically in scripting.

Power users vs. minimalists 
Interface design may have to make trade-offs between confusing beginners and minimalists versus annoying experts or power users. These concerns may overlap partially with the blinking twelve problem, in which a complex user interface causes users to avoid certain features. It may be extremely difficult to both appeal to new users, who want user interfaces to be intuitive, and experts, who want power and flexibility.

However, there are solutions for these problems, such as:
 Product variations
 Operation modes
 More advanced features, options and settings logically separated in submenus.

Users may also erroneously label themselves as power users when they are less than fully competent, further complicating the requirements of designing software which caters to the desires and needs of those users.

Simplicity vs. efficiency 
A simple intuitive interface often increases the technical complexity of a program and impedes its efficient use, while a well-designed but complex-seeming interface may increase efficiency by making many advanced features quickly accessible to experts. For example, a program with many advanced keyboard shortcuts may seem to be needlessly complex, but experienced power users may find it easier and quicker to avoid long sequences of mouse clicks to navigate menus and popups. Such menus and popups may exist to intuitively guide new users along a desired course of action, but they are often overly-simplistic by design so that novices might easily grasp the required steps. Providing both interfaces simultaneously is an option but requires greatly extended development time, so trade-offs are often made.

Officialized roles

SAP and Oracle
SAP and Oracle are enterprise systems that require a complex set of training to gain professional certification.  Because of this, and also to encourage engagement with the systems, many companies have created a "Super User Model" (also called Power User, Champion) to take regular users and raise them to a level of leadership within the system.  Doing this accomplishes three objectives:

 More engaged use of the system as there is a personal face assigned to champion the system and make acceptance of the technology less challenging.
 A significant time and cost reduction as companies are not seeking or hiring new or temporary resources for the purposes of developing and/or delivering documentation, training, and support.
 ROI or proof of concept of the SAP investment should be more easily achieved as users are directly involved, thereby using the system invested in, which benefits the company overall.

Extensive research has been done with the Super User Model in SAP, specifically in regard to the role they take in training and supporting end users.  Currently, more than 70% of SAP companies utilize a form of the Super User Model.

Windows administration
In Microsoft Windows 2000, Windows XP Professional, and Windows Server 2003, there is a "Power Users" group on the system that gives more permissions than a normal restricted user, but stops short of Administrator permissions. If a user is a member of the Power Users group, they have a greater chance of exposing the system to malware over a normal user and can promote their account to an Administrator by purposely installing malware. Thus, the Power Users group should be used with trustworthy and knowledgeable users only; it is not suitable to contain untrustworthy users.  The Power Users group was made obsolete in Windows Vista as part of the consolidation of privilege elevation features in the introduction of User Account Control. In Windows Vista Business l or higher, you can still create a "power user" via local users and groups, but there is no difference from a standard user because all the ACL entries of the file system are completely removed.

See also
 Luser
 Superuser
 Prosumer

References

External links

 Comparison of permissions of power users, administrators and other user groups in Windows active directory

Computing terminology